Auto Alley is an area of concentrated automobile manufacturing in North America.

Dozens of plants are in the area of highest concentration in southeastern Michigan (including the Motor City of Detroit), Ohio, and southern Ontario. The band includes neighboring states on the Great Lakes, and extends south to the Gulf of Mexico, generally between the Appalachian Mountains and the Mississippi River.From southern Michigan (including Detroit) to Alabama. As of 2015, though parts suppliers operate in most states (though disproportionately in Auto Alley), there is only one plant owned by an automobile manufacturer on the East Coast. Only a few automaker-owned plants are substantially west of the Mississippi River—in Kansas City, Texas, and coastal California. In Mexico, plants are concentrated near the Coahuila-Nuevo León border, and in central Mexican states.

References

Economic regions of the United States